Bottas is a surname.  Notable people with the surname include:

 Emilia Bottas (now Pikkarainen; born 1992) Finnish swimmer, Valtteri's ex-wife
 Valtteri Bottas (born 1989) Finnish Formula One driver, Emilia's ex-husband

See also

 Botta, a surname
 Botas (disambiguation)